A missile is a self-propelled guided projectile used as a weapon towards a target.

Missile may also refer to:

 Projectile, any thrown object
 Missile, another name for a dart
 Missile (1988 film), a 1988 documentary film
 Missile (2016 film), an Indian film
 "Missile" (IAMX song), 2005
 Missile (Lartiste song), 2016
 Missiles (album), a 2008 album by The Dears
 Missile (Ghost Trick), a pomeranian in the 2010 Nintendo DS video game Ghost Trick: Phantom Detective
 "Missile", a song by Dorothy from the 2016 album Rockisdead
 The Missile, nickname of American football player Qadry Ismail
"Missile ++", a 1998 song by Blonde Redhead

See also 

 Missal (disambiguation)
 Mistle thrush, a species of bird